The Mall of Arabia is a shopping mall located in Jeddah in the Kingdom of Saudi Arabia. The mall is located on the eastern side of the Medina Road and south of Makkah Road, near the King Abdulaziz International Airport. The mall has an area of 261,000 square meters. It also contains Kidzania Jeddah.

See also
Mall of Arabia (Dubai)
Red Sea Mall

References

External links
Official website

2008 establishments in Saudi Arabia
Shopping malls in Saudi Arabia
Buildings and structures in Jeddah
Shopping malls established in 2008
Tourist attractions in Jeddah